Poltys is also a genus of spiders

In Greek mythology, Poltys (Ancient Greek: Πόλτυς) is a mythical king and eponym of the Thracian city of Poltyobria (or Poltymbria; also called Aenus), featured in Apollodorus's account of the story of the hero Heracles. Poltys and his brother Sarpedon are given as sons of the sea-god Poseidon.

Mythology 
Poltys hosted Heracles when the hero came to Aenus; although Poltys welcomed Heracles, Sarpedon did not, and was slain by Heracles on the beach.

In a story related by Plutarch (Morals), Poltys ruled at the outbreak of the Trojan War, and was solicited both by the Trojan and Greek ambassadors. Poltys advised Paris to restore Helen, promising to give him two beautiful women to replace her. The advice was declined.  Homer does not mention Poltys in the Iliad, and the story is obviously post-Homeric.

Notes

References 

 Pseudo-Apollodorus, The Library with an English Translation by Sir James George Frazer, F.B.A., F.R.S. in 2 Volumes, Cambridge, MA, Harvard University Press; London, William Heinemann Ltd. 1921. . Online version at the Perseus Digital Library. Greek text available from the same website.
 Stephanus of Byzantium, Stephani Byzantii Ethnicorum quae supersunt, edited by August Meineike (1790-1870), published 1849. A few entries from this important ancient handbook of place names have been translated by Brady Kiesling. Online version at the Topos Text Project.
 Strabo, The Geography of Strabo. Edition by H.L. Jones. Cambridge, Mass.: Harvard University Press; London: William Heinemann, Ltd. 1924. Online version at the Perseus Digital Library.  Strabo, Geographica edited by A. Meineke. Leipzig: Teubner. 1877. Greek text available at the Perseus Digital Library.

Mythological kings of Thrace
Children of Poseidon
Kings in Greek mythology
Greek mythology of Thrace